The Men's team normal hill ski jumping event at the FIS Nordic World Ski Championships 2011 was held 27 February 2011 at 15:00 CET. This event was last held at the 2005 championships in Oberstdorf and was won by the Austrian team of Loitzl, Andreas Widhölzl, Thomas Morgenstern, and Martin Höllwarth.

Results

References

FIS Nordic World Ski Championships 2011